Marlin Bay was a New Zealand one-hour drama television series which ran for 39 episodes from 1992 to 1994. The series was set in a fictional resort and casino in the picturesque far north of New Zealand. The series dealt with issues regarding the high-flying lifestyle surrounding the hotel and casino, and the contrasting lives of the area's local residents.  The cast included Ilona Rodgers, Andy Anderson, Katie Wolfe, and featured Kevin Smith and Lucy Lawless. It was produced by South Pacific Pictures.

References

External links 
View clips from one episode at NZ On Screen 
IMDb Page

New Zealand drama television series
Television shows funded by NZ on Air
Television series by South Pacific Pictures
1991 New Zealand television series debuts
1994 New Zealand television series endings
1990s New Zealand television series